Renneville is a commune in the Ardennes department in northern France.

Population

Politics and Administration 
The municipal council meeting on March 28, 2014 following the municipal elections of 2014 could not elect of mayor, no candidate not proposing. The municipality is then administered by Philippe Dumange, the only city councilor who has not resigned, pending new elections held on May 18 and 25, 2014, which lead to the election of Yves Brédy, mayor during the village 2008–2014.

See also
Communes of the Ardennes department

References

Communes of Ardennes (department)
Ardennes communes articles needing translation from French Wikipedia